Bittium philomelae is a species of sea snail, a marine gastropod mollusk in the family Cerithiidae.

Description 
The maximum recorded shell length is 3.2 mm.

Habitat 
Minimum recorded depth is 183 m. Maximum recorded depth is 274 m.

References

External links

Cerithiidae
Gastropods described in 1880